Graham Baker (born 3 December 1958) is an English former footballer who played as a midfielder for Southampton, Manchester City and Fulham.

Playing career

Southampton
Born in Southampton, Baker started his football career when he signed for Southampton F.C. as a junior in 1973. His first team debut came on 12 November 1977 in a Second Division match against Blackpool, in which he scored in the opening minute. Baker made only two further appearances that season, in which Southampton were promoted to the First Division.

He was a hard-tackling, hustling type of player who could pass and shoot and was one of the most industrious performers in Southampton's successful quest to re-establish themselves in Division 1. In the 1978–79 season he established himself in the first team, making 22 League appearances in midfield, playing alongside Steve Williams, Alan Ball and Nick Holmes. Although Southampton played in the League Cup final in 1979, Baker only made one substitute appearance during the whole run, with either Trevor Hebberd or Austin Hayes generally being preferred.

Over the next three seasons, he continued to be a regular in Saints' midfield, and in the 1980–81 season he was a virtual ever-present making 39 appearances (scoring 8 goals), now playing alongside Kevin Keegan and Mick Channon, as Saints finished in 6th place in Division 1, then their highest league finish.

During his time at Southampton he was twice capped by England at under-21 level, playing against Norway and Romania in 1980. He made 113 League appearances for Southampton before being sold to John Bond's Manchester City for £350,000 in the 1982 close season, as Lawrie McMenemy needed to raise funds to finance the signing of Peter Shilton.

Manchester City
Baker's Manchester City career started well; the team won four of their first five games, including a 2–1 win over Tottenham Hotspur in which Baker scored both goals, and City became early league leaders. However, the good form did not last and the season turned into a struggle in the bottom half of the table, culminating in relegation on the final day of the season.

The 1983–84 season was a reasonably prosperous one for Baker as he scored 8 goals in 36 games, equalling the highest goal scoring return of his career, though Manchester City finished one place short of promotion. Injuries disrupted Baker's next season, in which he made 29 appearances in a promotion winning side. On his return to the top flight, Baker made few appearances – nine in the 1985–86 season and thirteen in 1986–87. In 1987 Manchester City were again relegated, and Baker returned to Southampton on a free transfer, having made 135 Manchester City appearances in five years.

Return to Southampton
By now, Southampton were under the management of Chris Nicholl, and the "glory days" of McMenemy were becoming a distant memory. At first, Baker was again a first-choice player, making 36 appearances in 1987–88, alongside Jimmy Case, Glenn Cockerill, and Andy Townsend, with the emerging talents of Danny Wallace and Alan Shearer up front. Gradually, however, his career at Southampton was disrupted by injury, and in 1990 he went to Fulham on a free transfer after losing his place in midfield to Barry Horne.

Managerial and coaching career
In 1988 Baker was the manager of Locks Heath Dynamos Youth Team. Winning the Portsmouth Lads League two years in a row and the Sperrings Intermediate Cup, Baker drew comparisons to a young Brian Clough. He had a brief spell in 1994 as manager at Petersfield Town and from 1995 to 2003 he was a coach with Carshalton Athletic. In 2005 became Youth Development Officer at Woking, under the management of former Southampton colleague, Glenn Cockerill. Glenn Cockerill departed in March 2007 and Graham Baker was appointed joint caretaker manager with club captain Neil Smith.

He took over as caretaker manager at Woking on 2 April 2009, following the sacking of Phil Gilchrist. The club's relegation from the Conference National was confirmed on 21 April, while he was in charge. The following day, he was given the job permanently, but Baker left the club on 19 January 2011. Baker was appointed Head of Youth at Aldershot Town in 2011.

Personal life
After retiring from football he became a driving instructor in Cheam.

He was also a keen cricketer enjoying a spell with local side Old Tenisonians in 90s. He was Club Captain during his time at the club, his abrasive style showing heavy signs of life in professional sport. He enjoyed moderate success at the club before leaving to concentrate on his football coaching career.

He is married to Erica and has three children, Oliver, Luke and Megan.

Career statistics

Notes

References

Bibliography

External links
Profile on Football Heroes about first spell at Southampton
Profile on Football Heroes about spell at Manchester City
Profile on Football Heroes about second spell at Southampton

1958 births
Living people
Footballers from Southampton
English footballers
Association football midfielders
Southampton F.C. players
Manchester City F.C. players
Aldershot F.C. players
Fulham F.C. players
English football managers
Woking F.C. managers
England under-21 international footballers